= Rashat Rahman Zico =

Bangladeshi writer and screenwriter

- রাসয়াত রহমান জিকো
- Born: October 28, 1986 (age 40); Dhaka, Bangladesh
- Education: University of Dhaka; New York University
- Occupations: Writer, novelist, screenwriter, columnist
- Spouse: Maksuda Aziz
- Children: 1

Rashat Rahman Zico (born 28 October 1986), known professionally as Zico, is a Bangladeshi writer, novelist, screenwriter, and columnist. His works include Hello Shunchen, Laaf, and Half Chance, which have been adapted for television.

== Early life and education ==
Rashat Rahman Zico was born on 28 October 1986 in Dhaka, Bangladesh. He attended Government Laboratory High School and later studied at Dhaka College. He earned a master's degree in physics from the University of Dhaka and subsequently completed an Evening MBA in Finance at the same university. In 2025, he earned a Master of Science (M.S.) from New York University in New York City.

== Career ==
Prior to moving to the United States, Rahman worked as an investment banker for a Bangladeshi state-owned bank.

Rahman's first professional engagement was with Delta Bay Production & Distribution House, where he worked on the research team of the television quiz show Ke Hote Chay Kotipoti.

In addition to fiction writing, Rahman has written sports features and opinion articles for Bengali-language newspapers. His writings have appeared in Prothom Alo, including articles on international football and the FIFA World Cup.

== Literary works ==
Rahman is the author of several Bengali-language books, including:

- Bakaida
- Raf Khata
- Je Prohore Nei Ami
- Kolom
- One Down
- Pratisaron
- Emotional Superhero
- Sondha Namar Khone

== Screenwriting and adaptations ==
Several of Rahman's literary works have been adapted for television.

One of Zico's stories was adapted into the television drama Hello Shunchen?, directed by Mizanur Rahman Aryan and starring Afran Nisho and Tanjin Tisha. According to Prothom Alo, the story was first published in a Facebook group before being included in a book by Zico in 2014.

Rahman wrote the story for the television drama Laaf, directed by Mizanur Rahman Aryan.

His novel Kolom was adapted into the telefilm Half Chance, directed by Shihab Shaheen and released as part of Bongo BoB Season 2.
